East Morton is a small village which lies  north of Bingley and  east of Keighley, in the county of West Yorkshire, England. The village has a population of 1,169 according to the 2011 census.

History 

The place name Morton historically indicated a marsh or moor settlement. East and West Morton, together with Riddlesden and a large area of Rombalds Moor, formed the chapelry of Morton in the ancient parish of Bingley in the West Riding of Yorkshire.  The chapelry became the parish of Morton by an act of Parliament in 1846, and in 1866 became a civil parish.  The civil parish was abolished in 1938 and absorbed into the civil parish and municipal borough of Keighley, itself abolished in 1974 and absorbed into the City of Bradford Metropolitan District in the new county of West Yorkshire.  The civil parish of Keighley, including East and West Morton, was reconstituted in 2002 with a town council.

Geography 
East Morton is situated on the northern side of the Airedale valley.

Landmarks 

East Morton has a Public House called the Busfeild Arms named after the local Busfeild family who lived in the area in the 19th Century, hence the apparent misspelling of the name.  There is also a Church of England Primary School and St. Luke's church dating back to 1851, when it was consecrated for worship.

East Morton has grown substantially in recent years, with several new housing developments, including Waterside Fold which adjoins the Leeds and Liverpool Canal at the southern end of the village.  The village also incorporates the Fardew golf course and a recreational playground.

Transport
Bus services K17 and K19 link the village with Keighley and Bingley Monday to Saturday, with financial assistance from West Yorkshire Metro. The A650 relief road provides a nearby road link to the rest of the Aire valley.

See also
Listed buildings in Keighley

References

External links 

 

Villages in West Yorkshire
Geography of the City of Bradford